The Truth is a play in four acts by Clyde Fitch, first performed in 1906
(some sources say 1907).

Synopsis
Eve Lindon is a 1903 society matron who suspects her husband, Fred, of having an affair with her good friend Becky Warder. She hires a private detective to follow him around and finds out that Becky and Fred have seen each other almost every day. Eve Lindon goes to Becky Warder's house to confront Becky, but Becky lies about seeing Tom so often. Eve announces her fears to Tom Warder, who vehemently disbelieves Eve's claims. He doesn't believe his wife would ever lie to him. The situation is complicated by Becky's view of reality, that she can lie whenever and however she wants. Becky has told so many lies that her claims that she hasn't been meeting with Fred daily begin to sound suspicious to Tom.

External links
Biography at Theatre Database
Review of 2006 revival at Metropolitan Playhouse
Book digitized by Google 
Original cast listing

1906 plays
Plays by Clyde Fitch